"After the Rain" is a song by Australian hard rock group the Angels, released in November 1978 as the fourth and final single from their second studio album Face to Face. "After the Rain" peaked at number 52 during a 21-week run.

Track listing 
AP 11823
 After The Rain (Doc Neeson, John Brewster, Richard Brewster) - 2:59
 Who Rings The Bell (Doc Neeson, John Brewster, Richard Brewster) - 2:50
 Coming Down (Doc Neeson, John Brewster, Richard Brewster) - 3:19

Personnel 
 Doc Neeson – lead vocals
 Richard Brewster – lead guitar
 John Brewster – rhythm guitar
 Chris Bailey – bass guitar
 Graham "Buzz" Bidstrup – drums
production team
 Engineer – Mark Opitz
 Producer – Mark Opitz, The Angels
 Written-By – Doc Neeson, John Brewster, Richard Brewster (tracks: 1, 2, & 3)

Charts

References 

The Angels (Australian band) songs
1978 songs
1978 singles
Songs written by Doc Neeson
Songs written by John Brewster (musician)
Albert Productions singles